

Assia may refer to:

People
 Assia Noris (1912–1998), Russian Italian film actress
 Assia (singer) (born 1973), French pop singer
 Assia Djebar (1936–2015), Algerian novelist, translator and filmmaker
 Assia Wevill (1927–1969)
 Assia Dagher (1908–1986), Egyptian actress and film producer
 Lys Assia (1924-2018), Swiss pop singer
 Assia Sidhoum (born 1996), Algerian footballer

Other uses 
 Askeia or Assia, Cyprus
 Assia, Batroun, a villiage in the Batroun District of Lebanon
 ASSIA (company), a supplier of network management software
 Applied Social Sciences Index and Abstracts (ASSIA), an indexing and abstracting service

See also 
 Asya (disambiguation)